New Durham is a town in Strafford County, New Hampshire, United States. The population was 2,693 at the 2020 census. It is drained by the Merrymeeting, Cocheco and Ela rivers, and is known for Merrymeeting Lake. New Durham is home to the Powder Mill Fish Hatchery, located on Merrymeeting Road. Also located here is the Lions Club's Camp Pride, a camp for children and adults with special needs.

History
Granted by the Masonian Proprietors in 1749 as "Cochecho Township", New Durham was first settled by Europeans in 1750, almost entirely by colonists from Durham. It would be incorporated as "New Durham" on December 7, 1762. With a somewhat uneven and rocky surface, the town was better suited to grazing than cultivation. Lumber became the chief article of trade, and by 1859 New Durham had five sawmills and four shingle mills. It also had two gristmills, and a gunpowder factory called the Eureka Powder Works. On September 19, 1849, the Cocheco Railroad opened through the town, connecting Dover with Alton Bay.

An early town minister, Reverend Benjamin Randall, founded a new religious denomination in 1780 called the Free Will Baptists, later known as Free Baptists. The church has two buildings in the community; the older built in 1819 on New Durham Ridge.

Geography
The southern part of the town is drained by the headwaters of the Cocheco River and its tributary, the Ela River, and is part of the Piscataqua River watershed, flowing to the Atlantic Ocean at Portsmouth. The northern part of town is home to Merrymeeting Lake and its outlet, the Merrymeeting River, which flows west to Lake Winnipesaukee and is part of the Merrimack River watershed. The mountain's  summit is in the neighboring town of Brookfield, in Carroll County.

New Durham is served by New Hampshire Route 11.

Adjacent municipalities
 Wolfeboro (north)
 Brookfield (northeast)
 Middleton (east)
 Farmington (southeast)
 Alton (west)

Demographics

As of the census of 2000, there were 2,220 people, 819 households, and 630 families residing in the town.  The population density was 53.2 people per square mile (20.6/km2).  There were 1,309 housing units at an average density of 31.4 per square mile (12.1/km2).  The racial makeup of the town was 98.15% White, 0.23% African American, 0.18% Native American, 0.54% Asian, 0.27% from other races, and 0.63% from two or more races. Hispanic or Latino of any race were 0.41% of the population.

There were 819 households, out of which 36.1% had children under the age of 18 living with them, 67.2% were married couples living together, 4.9% had a female householder with no husband present, and 23.0% were non-families. 17.0% of all households were made up of individuals, and 5.6% had someone living alone who was 65 years of age or older.  The average household size was 2.71 and the average family size was 3.05.

In the town, the population was spread out, with 27.3% under the age of 18, 4.3% from 18 to 24, 32.8% from 25 to 44, 24.9% from 45 to 64, and 10.7% who were 65 years of age or older.  The median age was 38 years. For every 100 females, there were 107.7 males.  For every 100 females age 18 and over, there were 106.5 males.

The median income for a household in the town was $52,270, and the median income for a family was $52,941. Males had a median income of $35,574 versus $28,092 for females. The per capita income for the town was $22,139.  About 3.7% of families and 5.1% of the population were below the poverty line, including 5.9% of those under age 18 and 6.6% of those age 65 or over.

Notable people 

 Alfred M. Jones (1837–1910), Midwest politician and businessman born in New Durham
 Benjamin Randall (1749–1808), minister

See also

 New Durham Meetinghouse and Pound
 New Durham Town Hall

References

External links

 
 New Durham Public Library
 New Hampshire Economic and Labor Market Information Bureau Profile
 First Free Will Baptist Church of America – New Durham

 
Towns in Strafford County, New Hampshire
Populated places established in 1750
Towns in New Hampshire